Spencer Abbott may refer to:

Spencer Abbott (baseball) (1877–1951), American baseball player and manager 
Spencer Abbott (ice hockey) (born 1988), Canadian ice hockey player 
Spencer Abbott, past member of the American Indie rock band Daphne Loves Derby